The 2012–13 Cypriot Cup was the 71st edition of the Cypriot Cup. A total of 28 clubs entered the competition. It began on 31 October 2012 with the first round and concluded on 22 May 2013 with the final which was held at Tsirion Stadium. Apollon Limassol won their 7th Cypriot Cup trophy after beating AEL Limassol 2–1 (aet) in the final.

Format
In the 2012–13 Cypriot Cup, participated all the teams of the Cypriot First Division and the Cypriot Second Division. Teams from the two lower divisions (Third and Fourth) competed in a separate cup competition.

The competition consisted of five rounds. In the first round each tie was played as a single leg and was held at the home ground of the one of the two teams, according to the draw results. Each tie winner was qualifying to the next round. If a match was drawn, extra time was following. If extra time was drawn, there was a replay at the ground of the team who were away for the first game. If the rematch was also drawn, then extra time was following and if the match remained drawn after extra time the winner was decided by penalty shoot-out.

The next three rounds were played in a two-legged format, each team playing a home and an away match against their opponent. The team which scored more goals on aggregate, was qualifying to the next round. If the two teams scored the same number of goals on aggregate, then the team which scored more goals away from home was advancing to the next round. 
 
If both teams had scored the same number of home and away goals, then extra time was following after the end of the second leg match. If during the extra thirty minutes both teams had managed to score, but they had scored the same number of goals, then the team who scored the away goals was advancing to the next round (i.e. the team which was playing away). If there weren't scored any goals during extra time, the qualifying team was determined by penalty shoot-out.

The final was a single match.

The cup winner secured a place in the 2013–14 UEFA Europa League.

Bracket

First round
The draw was made on 18 October 2012, with ties played on 31 October 2012, 7 and 21 November 2012.

Second round
The first legs played on 9 and 23 January 2013. The second legs played on 16, 23 and 30 January 2013.

The following four teams advanced directly to second round, meeting the twelve winners of first round ties:

Omonia (2011–12 Cypriot Cup winner)
AEL Limassol (2011–12 Cypriot Cup finalist)
Ermis Aradippou (2011–12 Cypriot First Division Fair Play winner)
PAEEK (2011–12 Cypriot Second Division Fair Play winner)
 

|}

Quarter-finals
The first legs played on 13, 20 February 2013 and on 6 March 2013. The second legs played on 6 and 13 March 2013.

|}

Semi-finals
The first legs played on 10 April 2013. The second legs played on 17 April 2013.

|}

First leg

Second leg

Final

See also
 Cypriot Cup
 2012–13 Cypriot First Division
 2012–13 Cypriot Second Division

References

Sources

Cypriot Cup seasons
2012–13 domestic association football cups
2012–13 in Cypriot football